The Argentine Football Association (AFA) is the governing body of football in Argentina based in Buenos Aires. It organises the main divisions of Argentine league system (from Primera División to Torneo Regional Federal and Primera D), including domestic cups: Copa Argentina, Supercopa Argentina, Copa de la Liga Profesional, Trofeo de Campeones de la Liga Profesional and the Supercopa Internacional. The body also manages all the Argentina national teams, including the Senior, U-20, U-17, U-15, Olympic and women's squads. Secondly, it also organizes the women's, children, youth, futsal, and other local leagues.

The AFA also organised all the Primera División championships from 1893 to 2016–17. From the 2017–18 season the "Superliga Argentina", an entity which was administrated independently and had its own statute, took over the Primera División championships. Nevertheless, the Superliga was contractually linked with the main football body. The last championship organised by the Superliga was 2019–20, shortly after the season ended the body was dissolved.

History 
The Argentine Association Football League (in English) was founded on 21 February 1893 by Alexander Watson Hutton, considered "the father" of Argentine football. The Argentine Association is the oldest in South America and one of the oldest to be formed outside Europe. In 1906 Florencio Martínez de Hoz became the first Argentine-born president of the association.

In 1912 the president of Gimnasia y Esgrima (BA), Ricardo Aldao, broke up with the association establishing an own league, the "Federación Argentina de Football" which organized a parallel tournament. Some teams moved to the FAF were Gimnasia y Esgrima (LP), Independiente, Estudiantes (LP) and Atlanta. The league lasted until 1914 when rejoining Asociación Argentina de Football forming a unique league for the 1915 season.

The second dissident league was formed in 1919 and named "Asociación Amateurs de Football", organizing its own championships (as FAF had done) until 1926 when it merged to the official association. The dissident league included some of the most prominent teams such as River Plate, Racing, Independiente and San Lorenzo, with the exception of Boca Juniors that remained in the official "Asociación Argentina de Football".

When both leagues merged for the 1927 season, the association was again renamed to "Asociación Amateur Argentina de Football" until the professionalization of the sport in 1931 when it switched to "Liga Argentina de Football". The first round of the recently created professional championship was on 31 May 1931.

Despite football turning professional in Argentina, some clubs wanted to remain amateur so they formed a new league, the "Asociación de Football Amateur y Profesionales", which organized a parallel tournament until 1934 when the dissident association merged with LAF on 3 November 1934 to form the "Asociación del Football Argentino" which has remained since.

In 2015, during the presidential elections to elect a new president for the body, there were two candidates to occupy Julio Humberto Grondona's chair, Marcelo Tinelli –who wanted a change in how things were going, like eliminating corruption between some clubs and the AFA– and Luis Segura, who had taken charge after Grondona's death, with the intention of extending his mandate.

With 75 presidents of different Argentine clubs voting, on election day something went wrong when the final count resulted in a draw of 38 to 38 (76 votes in total). The explanation given was that one of the electors put a double vote and that mistake was not reported. As a result, the executive committee decided to postpone the election.

After some meetings to put an end to the conflict, both candidates agreed to have another election in June 2016.

In June 2016, AFA president Luis Segura was charged with "aggravated administrative fraud". Segura has been replaced on an interim basis by the AFA's executive secretary, Damián Dupiellet.

In 2017, the association approved the creation of a new entity, named "Superliga Argentina de Fútbol", which would take over the organization of Primera División championship. The main European football leagues such as the English Premier League or the Spanish La Liga, that are organized by associations dedicated exclusively to those championships and run as separate entities from their respective National Associations, served as inspiration for the creation of the Superliga.

The 2016–17 Primera División championship was the last tournament organized by the AFA. Starting with the 2017–18 season to 2019–20 season, the "Superliga Argentina", an entity administrated by itself with its own statute, organised Primera División championships. In March 2020, AFA dissolved the Superliga and took over the Primera División again.

Names 
The body has been renamed several times since its establishment in 1893, in most of the cases translating the original English names to Spanish. The list of names is the following:

 Argentine Association Football League (1893–1903) 
 Argentine Football Association (1903–1912)
 Asociación Argentina de Football (1912–1927)
 Asociación Amateur Argentina de Football (1927–1931)
 Asociación de Football Amateurs y Profesionales (1931–1934)
 Asociación del Fútbol Argentino (1934–present) 

Notes

Current staff 
As of October 2021:

 President: Claudio Tapia 
 Vice-presidents: 
 Jorge Amor Ameal
 Rodolfo D'Onofrio
 Hugo Moyano
 Marcelo Tinelli
 Marcelo Achile 
 Guillermo Raed 
 General Secretary: Víctor Blanco
 Treasurer: Pablo Toviggino
 Executive Secretary: Nicolás Russo
 Men's senior head coach: Lionel Scaloni
 Men's U-20 head coach: Javier Mascherano
 Women's head coach: Carlos Borrello
 National teams General Director: César Luis Menotti

Competitions

Official Competitions
The list of official competitions organized by the Argentine Football Association since its creation in 1893 are:

Notes

Dissident Competitions
The following table include competitions organized by dissident associations.

Notes

Presidents

Official Association

Dissident Associations

Notes

References

External links

 
 Argentina at FIFA site

 
National members of CONMEBOL
 
Sports organizations established in 1893
Football
1893 establishments in Argentina